"Light It Up" is a song by New Zealand recording artist Stan Walker, which features American DJ, Static Revenger. It was released for digital download on 16 September 2011, as the second single from Walker's third studio album, Let the Music Play. The song was written by Dennis White, John Locke, Charissa Saverio and Jon Asher, and was produced by Static Revenger.

Background 
"Light It Up" was written by Jon Asher, Dennis White, John Locke and Charissa Saverio and was produced by Static Revenger. A snippet of the track was released online on 8 September 2011. It was then sent to Australian contemporary hit radio on 12 September, and was released for digital download on 16 September. In an interview with Nova FM, Walker spoke about the song, saying, "It's a really dance-y, fun track. It's kind of representing where I am at the moment ... where I am heading at the moment and it's just a song to ... lift people's spirits up."

Reception 
A writer for Take 40 Australia wrote that, "This snappy new track is an awesome party starter and will have your toes tapping for sure!" On 26 September 2011, "Light It Up" debuted and peaked at number 23 on the New Zealand Singles Chart. On 7 November 2011, it debuted at number 45 on the Australian ARIA Singles Chart.

Music video 
The music video for "Light It Up" premiered online on 16 September 2011. The video opens with various shots of Walker inside a construction site with flashing lights, listening to music on his iPad. Throughout the video, Walker is shown singing in front of pipes with flames on them, as well as intercut scenes of dance group Saea Banyana shown performing choreography.

Track listing 
Digital download
 "Light It Up" (featuring Static Revenger) – 3:30
 "Light It Up" (Extended Club Mix) – 6:35
 "Light It Up" (Static Revenger Dub) – 6:34

Credits and personnel 
Credits adapted from Let the Music Play liner notes.

Jon Asher – songwriter
Tom Coyne – mastering
James Kang – assistant mixer
John Locke – songwriter
Charissa Saverio – songwriter
Miles Walker – mixer
Dennis "Static Revenger" White – songwriter, producer

Charts

Weekly charts

Year-end charts

Certifications

References 

2011 songs
2011 singles
Stan Walker songs
Songs written by Jon Asher
Australian dance-pop songs
Dance-pop songs
Electropop songs
Sony Music Australia singles